Choran (Urduچوران) is a village, union council, and administrative subdivision of Jhelum District in the Punjab Province of Pakistan. It is part of Pind Dadan Khan Tehsil.

Location 
It is located at 32°35'57N 72°57'10E on the kilometres east from (6.0 km) of River Jhelum, the West from Choran the M2 motorway. lies (15.0 km) The Pind Dadan Khan Tehsil (10.0 km) from the east side of the Khewra salt mine (or (13.0 km) south of Mayo salt mine) is located in the east and is located 15 kilometers east of the interchange of the motorway M2 Lillah- Toba.

Choran Images

Dominant source of income 
Agriculture is the usual source of income.

People 

Most people are from the Khandowa tribe and are employees in the Pakistan Army.

Population 
Approximately 5000 people reside in this town.

Languages 
The language spoken in Choran is Punjabi with blend of many dialects such as Wanhari, Pothohari, and Lunhari.

Notable people  
Naseer Ahmed Khandowa, politician

References 

Villages in Union Council Golepur
Populated places in Tehsil Pind Dadan Khan
Villages in Pind Dadan Khan Tehsil